Bass Communion II is the second studio album released in 1999 by British musician, songwriter, and producer Steven Wilson under the pseudonym Bass Communion. The first edition was a double album with a second disc containing a track of sampled material provided by Robert Fripp and a remix by The Square Root of Sub. The 2002 reissue of the album excludes the remix by The Square Root of Sub and moves the Fripp-based track to the first disc, taking the album to a single CD. The album was later released on vinyl in December 2007 by Tonefloat Records and includes exclusive bonus material on Side D. In November 2008, the album was re-issued together with III in a 2CD edition limited to 1,200 copies.

Track listing

Original release

2002 and 2009 editions

Vinyl edition

Personnel 

 Steven Wilson – All Instruments
 Theo Travis – Flute, Saxophone

Other 

 Carl Glover - Graphic design and photography

Release history

References 

1999 albums
Bass Communion albums